Wiretap, or telephone tap, is the monitoring of telephone and Internet conversations by a third party.

Wiretap may also refer to:

 Wiretap (film), a proposed remake of the film Overhead
 WireTap (magazine)
 WireTap (radio program), a weekly radio program aired by the Canadian Broadcasting Corporation
 The Wiretap EP, a 2002 album by Your Enemies Friends

See also
 Wiretapper, a 1955 crime drama